The 2019–20 Biathlon World Cup – Stage 5 was the fifth event of the season and is held in Ruhpolding, Germany, from 15 to 19 January 2020.

Schedule of events 
The events took place at the following times.

Medal winners

Men

Women

References 

Biathlon World Cup - Stage 5, 2019-20
2019–20 Biathlon World Cup
Biathlon World Cup - Stage 5
Biathlon competitions in Germany